"Miracle" is the lead single by British duo Hurts taken off their second studio album Exile, which was released on 10 March 2013, exactly a day before the album release. The song premiered on BBC Radio 1 on 4 January 2013. In Germany, the "Robots Don't Sleep Remix" was released instead. A remix EP was released on 1 March.

Music video
Two versions of the music video exist. The first video was filmed in Colindale (London). The video was released on 4 February 2013.

Black colour dominates the video. Black marries the band's widescreen synthpop with this dark and dramatic journey through a post-apocalyptic shopping centre, peppered with religious imagery and fearless half-clad dancers, ending on a rooftop with the Hurts hashtag-like logo in flames. This version of the video was leaked and then deleted. The official music video was posted on Hurts official Vevo account on 28 February, giving a very different concept from the first version released.

First version was directed by Chris Turner and the second one by Frank Borin.

Live performances
Hurts performed the single live at The Jonathan Ross Show on 9 February 2013, which was their first performance of the song on a television programme.

Formats and track listing
iTunes single
"Miracle" — 3:44

Miracle (Robots Don't Sleep Remix) - iTunes single
"Miracle (Robots Don't Sleep Remix)" — 3:41

''Miracle (Remixes) - iTunes EP"Miracle" — 3:44
"Miracle (BURNS 50Hz Version)" — 4:47
"Miracle (Breakage's an Inferior Titles Moment Remix)" — 5:06
"Miracle (Russ Chimes Remix)" — 4:32
"Miracle (ATATIKA's 'Miraculous' Remix)" — 5:44Miracle (UK Remixes)'' - iTunes EP
"Miracle" — 3:44
"Miracle (BURNS 50Hz Version)" — 4:47
"Miracle (Breakage's an Inferior Titles Moment Remix)" — 5:06
"Miracle (Russ Chimes Remix)" — 4:32
"Miracle (Kill FM Remix)" — 5:11
"Miracle (∆T∆TIK∆'s 'Miraculous' Remix)" — 5:44

Personnel
 Hurts — keyboards, lyrics, music, programming, production, singer
 Pete Watson — piano, bass guitar
 Paul Walsham — drums
 Wil Malone – conductor, performance arranger
 Dan Grech-Marguerat – engineer, producer
 John Barclay, Tom Rees-Roberts – trumpet
 Duncan Fuller – assistant engineer
 Laurence Davis, Richard Watkins, Simon Rayner – horn
 Andy Wood, Richard Edwards – trombone
 Jakob Hermann – engineer, guitar
 Spike Stent – mixing engineer
 David Emery – assistant engineer
 Ted Jensen – mastering engineer

Charts

References

External links 
 

2013 singles
2013 songs
Hurts songs